Lu Chen (born September 20, 1987) is a Chinese actress. She is a contracted artist to the talent agency Cathay Media.

Biography
Lu was discovered by a principal photographer of the television series Eternal Beauty in 2006 and was invited the participate in the project. She has been acting since then.

Filmography

Films

TV series

References

External links
Official Sina blog 
Cathay Media page 
Sina

1987 births
Living people
Actresses from Heilongjiang
Actresses from Harbin
21st-century Chinese actresses
Chinese film actresses
Chinese television actresses